Zarangollo is a common dish in the Murcian countryside in Spain. It is frequently served in tapas bars in the area.

The dish is scrambled eggs with zucchini, onion, and occasionally potatoes. All ingredients are sliced very finely, fried in olive oil, and then mixed with the beaten eggs. The dish is served hot, and is generally served as an appetizer accompanied with wine, or as a side dish accompanying a fish main course.

Variations
In regards to potato, traditionally zarangollo did not contain it, but it started incorporating it in default of zucchini. Nowadays it is common to find zarangollo prepared with both ingredients.

See also 
 Pisto

Spanish cuisine
Appetizers
Egg dishes